Anna Lapushchenkova was the defending champion, but chose not to participate.
Yulia Putintseva won the title, defeating Caroline Garcia 6–4, 6–2 in the final.

Seeds

Main draw

Finals

Top half

Bottom half

References
 Main Draw
 Qualifying Draw

2011 ITF Women's Circuit
2011,Singles
2011 in Russian tennis